Texas's Eiffel Tower is a landmark in the city of Paris, Texas. The tower was constructed in 1993. It is a scale model of the Eiffel Tower in Paris, France, and is less than one tenth of the height of the original.

Background
This replica was built in 1993, the same year as another one in the United States, the Eiffel Tower in Paris, Tennessee. Original plans made the construction five feet taller than the one in Tennessee and a cowboy hat added to the top, in a competitive spirit, made the total height 65 feet.

Construction and details
It was built by members of the local welders’ union and is less than one tenth the height of the 1,063-foot original.  A shiny red cowboy hat was added to the top of the spindle in 1998. The tower has 27 thirty-watt LED lights which are programmed by color according to season (red and green at Christmas), and is also available for expectant parents to utilize the lights for gender reveals.

References

Towers in Texas
Eiffel Tower reproductions
Towers completed in 1993
Buildings and structures in Lamar County, Texas
Tourist attractions in Lamar County, Texas
Paris, Texas
1993 establishments in Texas